Floriskraal Dam is a combined gravity and buttress type dam located on the Buffels River, near Laingsburg, Western Cape, South Africa. It was established in 1957. The primary purpose of the dam is to serve for irrigation. Its hazard potential has been ranked high (3).

See also
List of reservoirs and dams in South Africa
List of rivers of South Africa

References 

Dams in South Africa
Dams completed in 1957